The following is a list of flags and banners used in Tanzania.

National Flag

Government Flags

German East Africa

Sultanate of Zanzibar

Regional Flags

Political Flags

Historical Flags

Kilwa Sultanate

Portuguese Zanzibar

Omani Zanzibar

Sultanate of Zanzibar

German Rule

British Rule

Republic of Tanganyika

People's Republic of Zanzibar

Proposed Flag

See also 

 Flag of Tanzania
 Coat of arms of Tanzania

References 

Lists and galleries of flags
Flags